The front raise is a weight training exercise. It primarily works the anterior deltoid, with assistance from the serratus anterior, biceps brachii and clavicular portions of the pectoralis major. The front raise is normally carried out in three to five sets during a shoulder workout. Repetitions depend on the lifter's training program and goals.

Form
To execute the exercise, the lifter stands with their feet shoulder width apart and weights or resistance handles held by their side with a pronated (overhand) grip. 

The movement is to bring the arms up in front of the body to eye level and with only a slight bend in the elbow. This isolates the anterior deltoid muscle (front of the shoulder) and uses the anterior deltoid to lift the weight.

A neutral grip, similar to that used in the hammer curl, can also be used. With this variation the weight is again raised to eye level, but out to a 45 degree angle from the front of the body.

Gallery

References

Weight training exercises